Dopatta is a Pakistani Urdu language film released on 28 March 1952.

Plot summary
The film story revolves around a girl who marries an army officer. They both soon have a baby daughter. Soon the husband is sent to the front of World War II. Later he is reported missing missing. After many months of anxiety and heartbreak, the husband returns disfigured, mutilated and not easily recognizable. The devoted wife still accepts him back despite his handicaps.

Cast
 Noor Jehan
 Sudhir
 Ajay Kumar
 Zarina
 Bibbo
 Ghulam Mohammad
 Azad

This film was directed by Sibtain Fazli and the music composer was Feroz Nizami whose film music and film songs became highly popular. The film's screenplay was written by Hakim Ahmad Shuja.

Soundtrack

References

Notes

External links

Pakistani drama films
1950s Urdu-language films
1952 films
Pakistani black-and-white films
Urdu-language Pakistani films